Baron Timothy de Paravicini (25 October 1945 – 17 December 2020) was an English electronics engineer and designer.

Biography
He was the founder of EAR Yoshino. He consulted for a number of Hi-Fi Manufacturers that include, Luxman, Quad and Musical Fidelity. He had involvement with the professional recording industry, designing custom equipment and consulted on sound engineering for Astoria studio, Paul Epworth's Church Studio and Mobile Fidelity's mastering studio.

References

External links
 
  earyoshino.com

1945 births
2020 deaths
British audio engineers